Tamanrasset or Tamanghasset ( Wilāya Tamanrāssat, Berber languages) is the largest province (wilaya) in Algeria. It was named after its province seat, Tamanrasset. The province has two national parks, more than any other in Algeria. They are Tassili n'Ajjer National Park and Ahaggar National Park. The province is the largest in Algeria as it is 557,906 km² large.

Geography
It is located in the deep southern region of Algeria and is 2000 km south of Algiers (capital of Algeria). On the north it is bordered by In Salah Province, on the north-east by Illizi Province, on the east by Djanet Province, on the south by In Guezzam Province, and on the west by Adrar Province, the second largest province by area, and Bordj Badji Mokhtar Province. Tamanrasset also has an international border with Niger. The province is the largest Algerian province with area of 336,854 km2 (130,060 sq mi) although it is located in the heart of the desert. The Province of Tamanrasset has a moderate climate because of its mountainous terrain. The province has an elevation of 1,400 meters. The highest point of Tamanrasset Province is Mount Tahat, which is also the highest point of Algeria with 3,303 meters. The most well known tourist destination is the Tomb of Tinhan.

History
The province was created from Oasis department in 1974.

Administrative divisions
The province is divided into 3 districts (daïras), which are further divided into 5 communes or municipalities.

See also

 Tadjellet
 In Guezzam Province
 In Salah Province

References

 
Tuareg
Provinces of Algeria
States and territories established in 1974